Catherine Jean Milligan (born 11 September 1986, Newtownards, County Down, Northern Ireland) was the 2006 Miss Northern Ireland, and represented the nation in the Miss World finals in Poland. She won Miss World Talent 2006, placing her in the semi-finals of the competition along with the other Top 16 contestants. She is the first Northern Ireland representative to have won a fast track event at Miss World.

Education
She attended Regent House Grammar School where she was Head Girl 2004/2005.

References

Miss Northern Ireland winners
Miss World 2006 delegates
People from Newtownards
Living people
1986 births
People educated at Regent House Grammar School